ISO 3166-2:IT is the entry for Italy in ISO 3166-2, part of the ISO 3166 standard published by the International Organization for Standardization (ISO), which defines codes for the names of the principal subdivisions (e.g., provinces or states) of all countries coded in ISO 3166-1.

Elements

Currently for Italy, ISO 3166-2 codes are defined for two levels of subdivisions:
 15 regions and 5 autonomous regions
 80 provinces, 2 autonomous provinces, 4 decentralized regional entities, 6 free municipal consortia and 14 metropolitan cities

Each code consists of two parts, separated by a hyphen. The second part is either of the following:
 two digits: regions
 two letters: provinces, decentralized regional entities, free municipal consortia and metropolitan cities

For the regions, the first digit indicates the geographical region where the subdivision is in:
 2, 3, 4: Northern Italy
 5: Central Italy (excluding Lazio)
 6, 7: Southern Italy (including Lazio)
 8: Insular Italy

For provinces, the two-letter part is an abbreviation of the province name, such as 'PG' for Perugia, although, as an exception, the code for former Medio Campidano whose name was based on its two capitals, Villacidro and Sanluri.

Vehicle registration plates
The two-letter provincial codes were used in vehicle registration plates between 1905 and 1994 (except for Rome, whose vehicle code has always been ROMA instead of RM).

In 1994, a new universal notation was introduced, dropping the province code entirely. This proved to be unpopular, and the two-letter code (or "ROMA") has been allowed to be added to a new, EU-style, blue border of the plates since 1999.

Current codes 
Subdivision names are listed as in the ISO 3166-2 standard published by the ISO 3166 Maintenance Agency (ISO 3166/MA). 

ISO 639-1 codes are used to represent subdivision names in the following administrative languages:
 (de): German
 (fr): French

Click on the button in the header to sort each column.

Regions

 Notes

Autonomous regions

 Notes

Provinces

Autonomous provinces

Decentralized regional entities

Free municipal consortia

Metropolitan cities

Changes
The following changes to the entry have been announced in newsletters by the ISO 3166/MA since the first publication of ISO 3166-2 in 1998:

Codes deleted on 9 April 2019

Code deleted on 22 November 2019

See also
 Subdivisions of Italy
 FIPS region codes of Italy
 NUTS codes of Italy

External links
 ISO Online Browsing Platform: IT
 Statoids.com: Provinces of Italy

ISO 3166-2
Italy geography-related lists
2:IT
ISO 3166-2
ISO 3166-2